The California Land Act of 1851, enacted following the Treaty of Guadalupe Hidalgo and the admission of California as a state in 1850,  established a three-member Public Land Commission to determine the validity of prior Spanish and Mexican land grants. It required landowners who claimed title under the Mexican government to file their claim with a commission within two years. Contrary to the Treaty of Guadalupe Hidalgo, which guaranteed full protection of all property rights for Mexican citizens, it placed the burden on landholders to prove their title.

While the commission eventually confirmed 604 of the 813 claims, almost all of the claims went to court and resulted in protracted litigation. The expense of the long court battles required many land holders to sell portions of the property or even trade it in payment for legal services. A few cases were litigated into the 1940s.

Legislation 

California Senator William M. Gwin presented a bill that was approved by the Senate and the House and became law on March 3, 1851.

The Act established a three-member Board of Land Commissioners, to be appointed by the President for a three-year term (the period was twice extended by Congress, resulting in a five-year total term of service). The Act required all holders of Spanish and Mexican land grants to present their titles for confirmation before the commission. Unless grantees presented evidence supporting their title within two years, the property would automatically pass into the public domain.

This requirement was contrary to Article Eight of the Treaty of Guadalupe Hidalgo, under which the United States agreed to respect the hundreds of land grants, many quite substantial, granted by the Spanish and Mexican governments to private landowners. Articles Nine and Ten guaranteed the property rights of Mexican nationals.

Hearings 

The land commission opened its sessions at San Francisco on January 2, 1852. It then consisted, by appointment of President Millard Fillmore, of Hiland Hall, Harry I. Thornton, and James Wilson as commissioners.  In 1853 President Franklin Pierce changed the board by the appointment of  Alpheus Felch, Thompson Campbell and R. Augustus Thompson as commissioners. Their commissions would, in accordance with the terms of the act, have expired in March, 1854; but previous to that time the operation of its provisions as to their power to act was extended for one year longer and afterward for another year.  In 1854 Peter Lott was appointed commissioner in place of Campbell; and in 1855 S. B. Farwell was appointed commissioner in place of Lott. On March 3, 1856, five years after the passage of the original act, the board finally adjourned sine die.

Land records 

American officials acquired the provincial land records of the Spanish and Mexican governments in the capital at Monterey. The new state's leaders soon discovered that the Mexican government had given a number of grants to Californios just before the Americans gained control. The Mexican governors had rewarded faithful supporters and hoped to prevent the recent American arrivals from gaining control of the land.

Indefinite maps

The commission required grantees to prove the validity of the grants they had received, including whether the grantee had fulfilled the requirements of the Mexican colonization laws. This included establishing a home in the land within one year. Grantees also had to establish their grant's exact boundaries. The early diseños or maps available were often little more than sketches. Land had until the gold rush been of little value and boundary locations were often quite vague, referring to an oak tree, a cow skull on a pile of rocks, a creek, and in some cases a mountain range.

Even in cases where the boundaries were more specific, many markers had been destroyed before accurate surveys could be made. While the Land Commission confirmed 604 of the 813 claims it reviewed, most decisions were appealed to US District Court and some to the Supreme Court. The confirmation process required lawyers, translators, and surveyors, and took an average of 17 years (including the Civil War, 1861–1865) to resolve. It proved expensive for landholders to defend their titles through the court system. In many cases, they had to sell a portion of their land to pay for defense fees or gave attorneys land in lieu of payment.

Conflicting claims

Land under Spanish and Mexican land titles that were   rejected by the courts entered the public domain. This resulted in conflicting claims by the grantees, squatters, and settlers seeking the same land. Congress was pressured to change the law. This resulted in additional pressure on Congress, and beginning with Rancho Suscol in 1863, it passed special acts that allowed certain claimants to pre-empt their land without regard to acreage. By 1866 this privilege was extended to all owners of rejected claims.

Mexican grants

A number of ranchos remained in whole or part in the sliver of Alta California that Mexico retained under the Treaty of Guadalupe Hidalgo, which became part of Baja California.  Rancho Tía Juana lost the title to its land in San Diego County but the balance of the rancho in Mexico was confirmed by the Mexican government in the 1880s.  Rancho El Rosario, Rancho Cueros de Venado and Rancho Tecate were each granted to citizens of San Diego in the 1820s or 1830s and lay wholly in what is now Baja California as was the Rancho San Antonio Abad, whose origin and title is more obscure.  Their titles were never subjected to dispute in U.S. courts.

Lengthy legal action

The Commission eventually confirmed 604 of the 813 claims received. John Bautista Rogers Cooper filed a claim for Rancho El Sur with the Public Land Commission in 1852 but he only received the legal land patent after years of litigation in 1866. While the majority (97%) of these cases were resolved by 1885, a few cases were litigated into the 1940s. Jose Castro filed a claim for Rancho San Jose y Sur Chiquito in 1853. He sold his land before his claim was decided. Before his case was decided, 32 others filed claims with the court that they owned a portion of his rancho. His successors litigated the claim for years. In 1882, Castro's original claim was finally validated by the court, and President Grover Cleveland signed the land patent on May 4, 1888, 35 years after Castro's initial filing.

Restoration of Catholic missions 

One of the more significant sets of claims was filed on February 19, 1853 on behalf of the Roman Catholic Church by Archbishop Joseph Sadoc Alemany, wherein he sought the return of all former mission lands in the State.

See also
 Ranchos of California
 United States Court of Private Land Claims

Notes

References
 U.S. Congress. Recommendation of the Public Land Commission for Legislation as to Private Land Claims, 46th Congress, 2nd Session, 1880, House Executive Document 46.

Defunct agencies of the United States government
Geography of the United States
Geography of California
Aboriginal title in the United States